Lara Tremouroux (born 6 April 1993) is a Brazilian actress.

Tremouroux is the daughter of Belgian actor Thierry Tremouroux and actress Lorena Silva, which gave Lara a great aptitude for the art world. Her first job on TV was as Sandrinha, in Babilônia. After that, she was part of the cast of Filhos da Pátria and Onde Nascem os Fortes, until she gained notoriety in Um Lugar ao Sol.

Filmography

References

External links
Lara Tremouroux at IMDb

Babilônia (TV series)
Brazilian actresses
1993 births
Living people